Basque Pelota was a demonstration sport at the 1968 Summer Olympics in Mexico City.  It was the third time that the sport was included in the Olympic program; it was an official Olympic sport at the 1900 Games in Paris, and a demonstration sport in 1924. It would be included as a demonstration sport once again at the 1992 Games in Barcelona.

Events

Medal table

Note: Since Basque Pelota was a demonstration sport, medals were awarded, but the medals were not "official" (and did not count in the respective nations' medal totals).

References

1968 Summer Olympics events
1968
1968 in basque pelota
Basque pelota competitions in Mexico
Men's events at the 1968 Summer Olympics
Olympic demonstration sports